Jeff Dayton (born 1953) is an American musician, singer, producer and songwriter most known as being the bandleader of the Jeff Dayton Band from 1984 to 2000.

Early life
Dayton was born in Minneapolis, Minnesota to George Dayton, a weekend pro guitarist and Patty Dayton, who played piano and sang. His stepfather Ruxton Strong played bass guitar. Growing up in a musical household, he developed an appreciation of folk, blues, classical, pop, rock and country music. He began playing guitar at the age of nine, and soon added drums, banjo and piano.

Dayton and his first band, "The Emperors," performed on local TV when he was still in grade school. While attending Mahtomedi Senior High School, The Blake School, and Orono High School graduating in 1971, he began writing music, while also giving time to academics and sports.

Dayton attended Southwest Minnesota State University (1971–1974), was introduced to both jazz and classical performing, and studied cello with True Sackrison at The Curtis Institute of Music. He joined the school's Jazz Ensemble, and later played guitar in the University of Minnesota, Twin Cities Jazz Ensemble with Dr. Frank Bencriscutto.  He studied jazz arrangement under Lance Strickland and later under Dr. Tom Ferguson at Arizona State University. At the University of Minnesota that he had the opportunity to work with Dizzy Gillespie, Thad Jones and Phil Woods and to make his first international tour to Mexico City to perform for then-President Lopez Portillo.

At Arizona State University (1980–1985), he completed his music degree, a Bachelor of Arts in Music Theory/Composition and Arranging graduating with honors.

Career 

Dayton performed with club bands in the upper Midwest, including a year with the KO Band, which included Kevin Odegard, David Z and Pdrummer Bobby Z.

Dayton moved to Fountain Hills, Arizona in late 1979, and in 1980 formed the Dayton-Privett Band with Mark Prentice, Tom Sawyer and Ron Privett. In 1982, Privett left the band, and was replace with Dave Watson; the band was renamed High Noon Band and continued until 1984. Dayton soon formed the Jeff Dayton Band, and over time about 70 different musicians performed under that name with Dayton, notably steel guitarist Ed Black, guitarist Bob "Willard" Henke, steel player Tommy "Bleu" Mortenson, fiddle/banjo player Dr. Ron Rutowski, Grammy winning producer Michael B (aka Mike Broening), drummer Mickey McGee, banjo player Bruce Leland, Steve Thomas, drummer Merel Bregante, Don Paddock, "Ramblin" Bruce Hamblin, bassist Doug Haywood, etc.[1][15]

The Jeff Dayton Band won the Wrangler Country Showdown in 1983 and the Marlboro Talent Roundup as well as New Times’ Best of the Decade's Best Award. In addition, Dayton wrote and recorded a song that became his first #1 record at KNIX-FM and earned a platinum songwriting award for a George Strait cut.

Dayton opened for Merle Haggard, The Judds and Alabama. After a chance meeting with Glen Campbell, which led to a jam session, Dayton and his band were hired to tour with Campbell.

For the next 15 years the Jeff Dayton band performed on worldwide tours, TV and record dates, celebrity events and many concerts. While Glen Campbell's’ musical director, he conducted many symphony orchestras and even Les Brown and His Band of Renown. Highlights included shows at the White House, NBC’s The Today Show and the Grand Ole Opry stage. Campbell and the Jeff Dayton Band also played with Gene Autry, Willie Nelson, Bob Hope, Vince Gill and dozens more."

Dayton and his family relocated to Nashville in 2000 to allow him to step up his writing and producing career. In 2002, Campbell opted for a smaller band and less touring, and Dayton left to focus more on songwriting and sessions on Music Row. Shortly after he was called to play guitar with Lee Greenwood’s band. For the rest of 2002 he was a regular member of Greenwood's tour.

In 2003, Dayton filled in with Kenny Chesney’s band for the Margaritas and Senoritas tour, playing on his first night in front of 16,000 in Madison, WI. With Kenny Chesney, he appeared on Late Night with Conan O’Brien and was in the live video "Live Those Songs Again" and Kenny's documentary "Road Case." He wrote songs with Eddie Montgomery of Montgomery Gentry and keyboardist Eddie Kilgallon. After the tour he returned as a full-time member of Lee Greenwood's band for the next two years.

Dayton has been a backup player for other musicians, including: Dizzy Gillespie (1977), Thad Jones (1978), Bo Diddley (1983), Steve Wariner (1983), Kenny Chesney (2003), Lee Greenwood (2002–2005), Tammy Cochran (2004), and Sarah Darling (2008–2010).

In 2014 Dayton is signed to Black River Music Group and is working with Chance McKinney, Hope Cassity, Maiden Dixie and Daisy Mallory.

Personal life 
Dayton has three young children and an adult daughter. His eldest daughter, Carrie Dayton is a YouTuber/internet personality.

Recording credits 

1978 Back to the Wall Peter Lang Guitar (Steel) 
1984 Does Fort Worth Ever Cross Your Mind George Strait Composer 
1992 Christmas with Glen Campbell [Delta] Glen Campbell Guitar (Acoustic), Guitar (Electric), Vocals (background) 
1992 Leave a Little Light Behind Jess Hawk Oakenstar Producer 
1994 Your Heart Will Show You Jess Hawk Oakenstar Dobro, Guitar, Bass (Electric), Guitar (Electric), Multi Instruments, producer, Mixing 
1995 Merry Arizona, (various artists)
1995 Live from Branson, Missouri: The Best of Glen Campbell Various Artists Guitar (Acoustic), Guitar (Electric), Vocals 
1996 Glen Campbell Live! His Greatest Hits Glen Campbell Guitar (Acoustic), Guitar (Electric), Vocals 
1996 Love Worth Fighting For Various Artists Guitar (Acoustic), Guitar (Electric), Producer, Lap Steel Guitar, Mix Down 
1996 Soul of My Own Jeanne Newhall Guitar (Acoustic) 
2001 E' Sensual Jeanne Newhall Guitar 
2001 Glen Campbell in Concert guitar
2003 Legacy 1961–2002 Glen Campbell Performer 
2009 Every Monday Morning Sarah Darling Composer  
2009 Avoid Heat and Flame Tabatha and Southern Fryd Composer  
2009 Words & Music: Nashville Various Artists Composer

References

External links 
http://www.jeffdaytonmusic.com/home.htm 
AllMusic|DAYTON&sql=11:avfrxq85ldke~T4[2]
AllMusic|DAYTON&sql=11:avfrxq85ldke~T3[3]

1953 births
Living people
American country singer-songwriters